Andrej Martin was the defending champion but lost in the quarterfinals to João Souza.

Federico Gaio won the title after defeating Thomaz Bellucci 7–6(7–5), 6–2 in the final.

Seeds

Draw

Finals

Top half

Bottom half

References
 Main Draw
 Qualifying Draw

2015 ATP Challenger Tour|Thindown Challenger Biella - Singles